The  was a short-lived conservative political party in the Meiji period Empire of Japan. It was also known as simply the Teiseitō.

History 
The Teiseitō was founded in March 1882, by the editor of the Tokyo Nichi Nichi Shimbun, Fukuchi Gen'ichirō, and a number of bureaucrats and conservative journalists as a political support group for the conservative Meiji oligarchy. The new party was supported by Itō Hirobumi and Inoue Kaoru  It advocated a constitutional monarchy with a constitution, to be eventually granted by Emperor Meiji, an electoral franchise based on adult male property holders and restrictions on freedom of speech and assembly. It viewed the populist political parties, especially the Rikken Kaishintō and the Jiyūtō as its main rivals. It was disbanded in September 1883.

References

Defunct political parties in Japan
Political parties established in 1882
Political parties disestablished in 1883
1882 establishments in Japan
Politics of the Empire of Japan
1883 disestablishments in Japan